A dot matrix printer is an impact printer that prints using a fixed number of pins or wires.  Typically the pins or wires are arranged in one or several vertical columns. The pins strike an ink-coated ribbon and force contact between the ribbon and the paper, so that each pin makes a small dot on the paper. The combination of these dots forms a dot matrix image. They were also known as serial dot matrix printers.

While inkjet and laser printers technically exhibit dot matrix printing, they work differently than impact "dot matrix printers" and can deposit ink or toner at higher dot resolutions more quickly, with less inherent noise. The impact printer has the ability to make copies using multi-part forms, unlike an inkjet or laser printer.

History

In the 1970s and 1980s, dot matrix impact printers were generally considered the best combination of cost and versatility, and until the 1990s were by far the most common form of printer used with personal and home computers.

The first impact dot matrix printer was the Centronics 101. Introduced in 1970, it led to the design of the parallel electrical interface that was to become standard on most printers until it was displaced well over two decades later by the Universal Serial Bus (USB).

Digital Equipment Corporation (DEC) was another major vendor, albeit with a focus on use with their PDP minicomputer line. Their LA30 30 character/second (CPS) dot matrix printer, the first of many, was introduced in 1970.

In the mid-1980s, dot-matrix printers were dropping in price, and began to outsell daisywheel printers, due to their higher speed and versatility. 

Increased pincount of the printhead from 7, 8, 9 or 12 pins to 18, 24, 27, or 36 permitted superior print quality, which was necessary for success in Asian markets to print legible CJKV characters. Epson's 24-pin LQ-series rose to become the new de facto standard, at 24/180 inch (per pass - 7.5 lpi). Not only could a 24-pin printer lay down a denser dot-pattern in a single-pass, it could simultaneously cover a larger area and print more quickly. Although the text quality of a 24-pin was still visibly inferior to a true letter-quality printer such as a daisy wheel or laser printer, print quality was greatly superior to a 9-pin printer. As manufacturing costs declined, 24-pin printers gradually replaced 9-pin printers.

By the dawn of the 1990s, inkjet printers became more common as PC printers.

DEC

Unlike the LA30's 80-column, uppercase-only 5x7 dot matrix, DEC's product line grew. New models included:
 LA36 (1974): supported upper and lower case, with up to 132 columns of text (also 30 CPS)
 LA34: a lower-cost alternative to the LA36
 LA38: an LA34 with more features
 LA180: 180 CPS
 LS120: 120 CPS
 LA120: 180 CPS (and some advanced features)
 LA12: a portable terminal - the DECwriter Correspondent

LA30
The DECwriter LA30 was a 30 character per second dot matrix printing terminal introduced in 1970 by Digital Equipment Corporation (DEC) of Maynard, Massachusetts

It printed 80 columns of uppercase-only 7×5 dot matrix characters across a unique-sized paper. The printhead was driven by a stepper motor and the paper was advanced by a noisy solenoid ratchet drive. The LA30 was available with both a parallel interface (LA30-P) and a serial interface (LA30-S); however, the serial LA30 required the use of fill characters during the carriage-return. In 1972, a receive-only variation named LA30A became available.

LA36
The LA30 was followed in 1974 by the LA36, which achieved far greater commercial success, becoming for a time the standard dot matrix computer terminal. The LA36 used the same print head as the LA30 but could print on forms of any width up to 132 columns of mixed-case output on standard green bar fanfold paper. The carriage was moved by a much-more-capable servo drive using a DC electric motor and an optical encoder / tachometer. The paper was moved by a stepper motor. The LA36 was only available with a serial interface but unlike the earlier LA30, no fill characters were required. This was possible because, while the printer never communicated at faster than 30 characters per second, the mechanism was actually capable of printing at 60 characters per second. During the carriage return period, characters were buffered for subsequent printing at full speed during a catch-up period. The two-tone buzz produced by 60-character-per-second catch-up printing followed by 30-character-per-second ordinary printing was a distinctive feature of the LA36, quickly copied by many other manufacturers well into the 1990s. Most efficient dot matrix printers used this buffering technique.

Digital technology later broadened the basic LA36 line into a wide variety of dot matrix printers.

LA50
The DEC LA50 was designed to be a "compact, dot matrix" printer. When in graphic mode (as opposed to text mode), the printhead can generate graphic images. When in (bitmap) graphics mode, the LA50 can receive and print Sixel graphics format.

Centronics 101
The Centronics 101 (introduced 1970) was highly innovative and affordable at its inception. Some selected specifications:
 Print speed: 165 characters per second
 Weight: 155 pounds (70.3 kg)
 Size: 27 ½" W x 11 ¼" H x 19 ¼ D (approx. 70 cm x 29 cm x 49 cm)
 Shipping: 200 pounds (approx. 91 kg), wooden crate, unpacked by removal of 36 screws
 Characters: 62, 10 numeric, 26 upper case and 26 special characters (no lower case)
 Character size: 10 characters per inch (10 "pitch")
 Line spacing: 6 lines per inch (6 LPI)
 Vertical control: punched tape reader for top of form and vertical tab
 Forms thickness: original plus four copies
 Interfaces: Centronics parallel, optional RS-232 serial

IBM 5103 

The IBM 5103 was the only IBM printer that could be attached to the IBM 5100, an early day portable computer. Printing was 8 DPI, 10 pitch, 6 LPI, and capable of printing bidirectionally from a 128 character set. Two models were offered: 80 and 120 characters per second.

Near Letter Quality (NLQ)

Near Letter Quality mode—informally specified as almost good enough to be used in a business letter—endowed dot-matrix printers with a simulated typewriter-like quality. By using multiple passes of the carriage, and higher dot density, the printer could increase the effective resolution. In 1985, The New York Times described the use of "near letter-quality, or NLQ" as "just a neat little bit of hype" but acknowledged that they "really show their stuff in the area of fonts, print enhancements and graphics."

NLQ printers could generally be set to print in "draft mode", in which case a single pass of the print head per line would be used. This produced lower quality print at much higher output speed.

PC usage
In 1985, PC Magazine wrote "for the average personal computer user dot matrix remains the most workable choice". At the time, IBM sold Epson's MX-80 as their IBM 5152.

Another technology, inkjet printing, which uses the razor and blades business model (give away the razor handle, make money on the razor blade) has reduced the value of the low cost for the printer: "a price per milliliter on par with liquid gold" for the ink/toner.

Personal computers 
In June 1978, the Epson TX-80/TP-80, an 8-pin dot-matrix printer mainly used for the Commodore PET computer, was released. This and its successor, the 9-pin MX-80/MP-80 (introduced in 1979/1980), sparked the popularity of impact printers in the personal computer market. The MX-80 combined affordability with good-quality text output (for its time). Early impact printers (including the MX) were notoriously loud during operation, a result of the hammer-like mechanism in the print head. The MX-80 even inspired the name of a noise rock band. The MX-80's low dot density (60 dpi horizontal, 72 dpi vertical) produced printouts of a distinctive "computerized" quality. When compared to the crisp typewriter quality of a daisy-wheel printer, the dot-matrix printer's legibility appeared especially bad. In office applications, output quality was a serious issue, as the dot-matrix text's readability would rapidly degrade with each photocopy generation.

PC Software
Initially, third-party printer enhancement software offered a quick fix to the quality issue. General strategies were:
 doublestrike (print each line twice), and 
 double-density mode (slow the print head to allow denser and more precise dot placement).

Some newer dot-matrix impact printers could reproduce bitmap images via "dot-addressable" capability. In 1981, Epson offered a retrofit EPROM kit called Graftrax to add this to many early MX series printers. Banners and signs produced with software that used this ability, such as Broderbund's Print Shop, became ubiquitous in offices and schools throughout the 1980s.

As carriage speed increased and dot density increased (from 60 dpi up to 240 dpi), with some adding color printing, additional typefaces allowed the user to vary the text appearance of printouts. Proportional-spaced fonts allowed the printer to imitate the non-uniform character widths of a typesetter, and also darker printouts. 'User-downloadable fonts' gave until the printer was powered off or soft-reset. The user could embed up to 2 NLQ custom typefaces in addition to the printer's built-in (ROM) typefaces.

Contemporary use 
The desktop impact printer was gradually replaced by the inkjet printer. When Hewlett-Packard's patents expired on steam-propelled photolithographically produced ink-jet heads, the inkjet mechanism became available to the printer industry. For applications that did not require impact (e.g. carbon-copy printing), the inkjet was superior in nearly all respects: comparatively quiet operation, faster print speed, and output quality almost as good as a laser printer. By 1995, inkjet technology had surpassed dot matrix impact technology in the mainstream market and relegated dot matrix to niche applications.

, dot matrix impact technology remains in use in devices and applications such as:
 Cash registers, 
 ATMs,
 Banking, passbook and cashiers checks,
 Time cards and parking stubs
 Multi-layer contracts for signature
 Fire alarm systems, 
 Point-of-sale terminals,
 British & Irish fire stations for turnout sheets
 Applications requiring continuous output on fan-fold paper.

Thermal printing is gradually supplanting them in some of these applications, but full-size dot-matrix impact printers are still used to print multi-part stationery. For example, dot matrix impact printers are still used at bank tellers and auto repair shops, and other applications where use of tractor feed paper is desirable such as data logging and aviation. Most of these printers now come with USB interfaces as a standard feature, to facilitate connections to modern computers without legacy ports.

References

Impact matrix printers
American inventions
20th-century inventions
Computer-related introductions in 1970